Just Dance Kids is a video game for the Wii developed by Japanese studio Land Ho!, and is part of Ubisoft's Just Dance franchise. Just Dance Kids is a dance-based music game with an emphasis on songs that are popular with children. The game was released on November 9, 2010 in North America, February 3, 2011 in Australia and February 4, 2011 in Europe (both under the title Dance Juniors). One of the kids in the game was Disney Channel star Cameron Boyce.

Gameplay
The game is identical to the other games in Ubisoft's franchise, Just Dance. Players are required to perform specific dance moves in time with the music, following a routine indicated on-screen by any three live-action dancers. Animated score icons judge how the players did the move. Like the original Just Dance, the game also includes shake moves, where players shake their Wii Remotes when the shake meter appears. If the player performs well, by dancing accurately and in-time, their score will build and their ranking is obtained upon completion of the song.

There are two other game modes, Team High Scores, and Freeze & Shake. Team High Scores mode has up to two teams of two dance together and allows one player to shake their Wii Remote when the spotlight hits them. And Freeze & Shake mode has players stop moving when the stop sign appears in addition to just shake moves.

Track listing
The game contains 42 songs.

All the songs included in the game excluding those by The Wiggles and Yo Gabba Gabba! are a special cover version for the game, not the original.

References

2010 video games
Just Dance (video game series)
Dance video games
Fitness games
Music video games
Ubisoft franchises
Ubisoft games
Video games developed in Japan
Wii games
Wii-only games
Multiplayer and single-player video games